Edward W. Thomas Jr. is a United States Air Force major general who serves as the Commander of the Air Force Recruiting Service. Previously, he was the Director of Public Affairs of the United States Air Force.

References

External links
 

Year of birth missing (living people)
Living people
Place of birth missing (living people)
United States Air Force generals
People from Reno, Nevada